Mangelia erminiana is a species of sea snail, a marine gastropod mollusk in the family Mangeliidae.

Description
The length of the shell attains 12 mm.

Distribution
This marine species occurs in the Sea of Cortez, Western Mexico

References

External links
  Tucker, J.K. 2004 Catalog of recent and fossil turrids (Mollusca: Gastropoda). Zootaxa 682:1–1295.

erminiana
Gastropods described in 1951